Laura Miclo, born 23 May 1988 at Saint-Die-des-Vosges is a French athlete, who specializes in middle distances and cross-country.

She began competing in 2004 for the Athletic Club of Upper Meurthe.

Her best performance is a national Cross Country title in the short course won on  7 March 2010 at La Roche-sur-Yon.  The following two years were injury-filled, marked by three stress fractures.  She tried in spite of all to compete in the Duathlon.

At the end of 2012, she joined the Athletic sport aixois which enabled her to reconcile competition with her profession of radiology.

Prize list  
 2014 
 French Cross Country championship—long course : silver medal.   
   2013    
 French Cross Country championship—long course: bronze medal.   
   2010    
 Record Lorraine U23s 800m   : 2:05.37   
 Cross Country Champion of France—long course in 10:35   
   3rd 1,500 meters in the Indoors championships of France  4:18.74 (record for Lorraine region).   
 university Indoor champion of France for the  800m.
 2009	
  Cross Country European Championships   :  28th U23s (Bronze Medal Team)   
 European Championships 1500 m U23s   : final 10th (heats 5th)   
 Champion of France U23s 800m   
 Vice-champion of France U23s 800m indoor   
 Record for Lorraine region U23s 1500m   : 4:15.03   
 Lorraine record U23 and senior for indoor 800m: 2:08.08   
 Lorraine record of U23s and senior 1500 m indoor: 4:20.67
 2008 	
  Cross Country European Championships   :  22nd U23s   
 Vice-champion of France U23s 1500 m   
   2007  	  
 European Championships 800m junior   :  9th   
 Junior Champion of France for 1500 m   
  Match Méditerranée featuring the countries ITA-ALG-ESP-FRA-TUN junior 1 500 m   :  1st   
   2006  	  
 Vice-champion of France junior 800m   
 Vice-champion of France junior 800m indoor

References

External links  

 

1988 births
Living people
French female middle-distance runners
People from Saint-Dié-des-Vosges
Sportspeople from Vosges (department)
21st-century French women